Hrvatski nogometni klub Hajduk Split is a Croatian football club founded in 1911, and based in the city of Split. Between the early 1920s and 1940, club regularly participated in the Kingdom of Yugoslavia national championship. Following World War II and the formation of the Yugoslav league system in 1946, Hajduk went on to spend the entire SFR Yugoslavia period in top level. Their run continued following the breakup of Yugoslavia, as the club joined the Croatian First League in its inaugural season in 1992, never having been relegated from its top tier. Since playing their first competitive match, more than 200 players made at least 100 appearances (including substitute appearances) or 100 goals for the first-team squad, all of whom are listed in a table below.

Frane Matošić holds the record for greatest number of appearances (both official and unofficial) for Hajduk, as well as greatest number of goals scored, with 729 goals in 739 matches. Vedran Rožić is official appearances record holder standing at 390, with Frane Matošić holding record for most official goals, at 309. Josip Skoko holds both records among Hajduk's foreign players with 287 appearances and 55 goals.

List of players
Players are listed chronologically. Appearances and goals are for first-team competitive matches, and include:
 League: Split subassoociation championship (1923–36), Yugoslav First League (1945–91) and Croatian First Football League (1992–current);
 Cup: Yugoslav Cup (1945–91), Croatian Football Cup and Croatian Football Super Cup (1992–current);
 Europe: UEFA competitions (1967–current);
 Unofficial: Exhibition games and unofficial cups or tournaments.

Bold denotes current players. Bold/italics denotes players currently on loan.
Statistics correct as of 30 April 2018

Trivia: During 2001, tennis player Goran Ivanišević was registered for Hajduk as a player.

List of captains (1994–)

References
N.B.: In the cases where different sources were contradicting each other, the data from the official site were used, if available. That data covers the all senior club appearances and goals, not only the competitive ones. The season's data from the official site includes only the domestic ligue and cup as well as the international cups games, so it has been used only as a reference for the period when a player had been playing.

External links
Official website 

Hajduk Split
Association football player non-biographical articles